Recep İvedik is a movie starring Şahan Gökbakar, which was released on February 21, 2008. It was filmed after the character of Recep İvedik was caught on TV. The trailer of the film, whose trailer was watched approximately 5 million 750 thousand times on the video sharing site YouTube as of March 2008, was released on February 21, 2008 with 230 copies after the great interest it received. Watched by 791,536 people in the first three days, Recep İvedik ranked second in the list of the most watched films in Turkey in the first 3 days. It was watched by 3 million 150 thousand people in 17 days.

Storyline
The movie is about a man trying to impress his childhood lover; although it may sound like a romantic movie, it is not. When Recep comes sees Sibel, he starts to remember the old days. From there on he goes into very ridiculous lengths to impress her. The story gets a bit complicated when Recep comes across many obstacles but overcomes everything in his own funny ways.

Cast
 Şahan Gökbakar as Recep İvedik
 Fatma Toptaş as Sibel
 Tuluğ Çizgen as Sibel's mother 
 Lemi Filozof as Fazil
 Hakan Bilgin as Müdür

Sequels

External links
  for the film (Turkish)
 
 
 
 

2008 films
2008 comedy films
Films set in Istanbul
Films set in Turkey
Fictional Turkish people
Turkish comedy films
2000s Turkish-language films